The 1813 Treaty of Stockholm was a "treaty of concert and subsidy" between Great Britain and Sweden. It was signed on 3 March 1813 by Alexander Hope and Edward Thornton for Great Britain and by Lars von Engeström and Gustaf af Wetterstedt for Sweden. The treaty secured Swedish military cooperation against Napoleon. In return, Great Britain would support the union of Sweden and Norway and pay subsidies to Sweden.

As part of the treaty, Sweden agrees to end its slave trade.  Also, Britain ceded Guadeloupe to Sweden and British merchants were granted trading rights at Gothenburg, Karlshamn, and Strålsund.

References

1813 treaties
1813 in Sweden
Stockholm
Stockholm (1813)
Treaties of the United Kingdom (1801–1922)
Stockholm (1813)